Tannet (859–904) was king of Pagan dynasty of Burma (Myanmar) from c. 876 to c. 904. A son of King Pyinbya, the founder of Pagan (Bagan), Tannet was the paternal grandfather of King Anawrahta, the founder of Pagan Empire. The king loved horses and was a master of horsemanship. He was assassinated by Sale Ngahkwe, his stable groom, who succeeded him as king.

Various Burmese chronicles do not agree on the dates regarding his life and reign. The oldest chronicle Zatadawbon Yazawin is considered to be the most accurate for the Pagan period. The table below lists the dates given by four main chronicles, as well as Hmannan's dates when anchored by the Anawrahta's inscriptionally verified accession date of 1044.

References

Bibliography
 
 
 

Pagan dynasty
859 births
904 deaths
9th-century Burmese monarchs
10th-century Burmese monarchs